An incomplete list of events which occurred in Italy in 1624:

Events
 The Action of 3 October 1624

Births
 Filippo Baldinucci
 Francesco Provenzale

Deaths
 Francesco Villamena

References